This is a list of A.S. Roma players who have been inducted into the club's Hall of Fame.

A.S. Roma's Hall of Fame has been launched in 2012 as part of the initiatives for the club's 85th anniversary.

Exceptionally for the starting 2012 Class, eleven players were chosen through an on-line voting process from an initial list of 55 retired players, composed by one goalkeeper (Franco Tancredi), one right-back (Cafu), two central defenders (Giacomo Losi and Aldair), one left-back (Francesco Rocca), two midfielders (Fulvio Bernardini and Agostino Di Bartolomei), one playmaker (Paulo Roberto Falcão), and three strikers (Bruno Conti, Roberto Pruzzo and Amedeo Amadei).

In the following years, the number of players elected has been intentionally reduced.

In 2017, following the retirement of Roma legend Francesco Totti, no players but him were included into the list.

List of Hall of Fame players
Nationality column refers to the country (countries) represented internationally by the player, if any.

References

External links
 A.S. Roma Hall of Fame at ASRoma.it

Hall of Fame
Halls of fame in Italy